Harvey Milk (1930–1978) was an American politician and LGBT rights activist.

Harvey Milk may also refer to:
 Harvey Milk (band), an American rock band
 Harvey Milk (opera), a 1995 opera by Stewart Wallace
 Harvey Milk High School, an LGBT high school in New York City
 Harvey Milk LGBTQ Democratic Club, a San Francisco political organization

See also
 Harvey Milk Day, a holiday celebrating the civil rights leader
 Milk (2008 American film), a 2008 biographical film on Harvey Milk
 Moscone–Milk assassinations, the 1978 assassinations of mayor George Moscone and Harvey Milk
 The Times of Harvey Milk, a 1984 documentary film on Harvey Milk
 USNS Harvey Milk (T-AO-206)